Lloyd Merton Bradfield (February 15, 1901 – June 7, 1986) was an American football and basketball coach. He served as the head football coach (1926–1927) and head basketball (1927–1929) at the University—now known as of University of Nebraska–Omaha. Bradfield was also the school's dean of men.

Head coaching record

Football

References

External links
 

1901 births
1986 deaths
Nebraska–Omaha Mavericks football coaches
Omaha Mavericks men's basketball coaches